|}

The Champion Stayers Hurdle is a Grade 1 National Hunt hurdle race in Ireland which is open to horses aged four years or older. It is run at Punchestown over a distance of about 3 miles (4,828 metres), and during its running there are fourteen hurdles to be jumped. The race is scheduled to take place each year during the Punchestown Festival in late April.

The race was known as the Tipperkevin Hurdle in the mid 1990s, and it was renamed the Champion Stayers Hurdle in 1997. It was sponsored by Ballymore Properties for much of the following decade, and was renamed the World Series Hurdle. Ladbrokes began supporting the race in 2008. It reverted to its former name in 2017.

The Champion Stayers Hurdle is the Irish equivalent of Britain's Stayers' Hurdle, and the last horse to win both races in the same year was Anzum in 1999.

Records
Most successful horse since 1995 (4 wins):
 Quevega – 2010, 2011, 2012, 2013

Leading jockey since 1995 (5 wins):
 Ruby Walsh – Asian Maze (2006), Fiveforthree (2009), Quevega (2011, 2012, 2013)

Leading trainer since 1995 (9 wins):
 Willie Mullins – Holy Orders (2003), Fiveforthree (2009), Quevega (2010, 2011, 2012, 2013), Faugheen (2018), Klassical Dream (2021,2022)

Winners since 1995

See also
 Horse racing in Ireland
 List of Irish National Hunt races

References
 Racing Post:

 racenewsonline.co.uk – Racenews Archive (April 25, 2003).

National Hunt races in Ireland
National Hunt hurdle races
Punchestown Racecourse